Here Come the Choppers is a 2005 album by Loudon Wainwright III.  The title track is an acerbic and blackly humorous reference to the Iraq War, reset in southern California's Miracle Mile.
"The inspectors found nothing
That’s just not right
Whole Foods and Kmart
Are targets tonight"
Perhaps the most remarkable track though, is Hank and Fred, a real-life account of Wainwright driving to the grave of Hank Williams when he heard the news, on the car radio, of the death of children's TV host Fred Rogers.  
"One New Years' Day Hank slipped away
Slumped over in the back
Oh, I hope he had his cardigan on
In that Cadillac"
The album is also notable for the seemingly unlikely recruitment of Bill Frisell on lead guitar.

The cover illustration is by Steve Vance.

Track listing
All tracks composed by Loudon Wainwright III

"My Biggest Fan"  – 6:02
"No Sure Way"  – 5:29
"Had to Be Her"  – 5:02
"Hank and Fred"  – 4:55
"Half Fist"  – 4:13
"To Be on TV"  – 4:03
"God's Country"  – 3:14
"Make Your Mother Mad"  – 4:06
"When You Leave"  – 5:22
"Nanny"  – 3:12
"Here Come the Choppers"  – 6:42
"Things"  – 4:06

Personnel
Loudon Wainwright III - acoustic guitar, vocals
Jim Keltner - drums, percussion
Bill Frisell - electric guitar
Greg Leisz - mandolin, pedal steel, electric & lap steel guitar
David Piltch - electric & acoustic bass
Coco Love Alcorn - vocals
Chris Gestrin - Wurlitzer
Shawn Pierce - Engineer, Audio Engineer, Mixing

Release history
CD: Sovereign Records

References

Loudon Wainwright III albums
2005 albums